Henry Henn (8 October 185821 October 1931) was a Church of England bishop. He was the third Bishop of Burnley from 1909 to 1931.

Born in Greystones, County Wicklow, Ireland on 8 October 1858, he was educated at Sherborne School and Trinity Hall, Cambridge. Ordained in 1886, his first post was a curacy at Preston Parish Church, after which he returned to his old college as its Dean. He moved back to Lancashire, at first as Vicar of St Paul’s in Preston, then he became Rural Dean of St Peter's, Bolton on 21 January 1902. During his incumbency at Bolton, he was appointed an honorary canon of Manchester Cathedral in 1903. In 1909, he was ordained to the episcopate, becoming the suffragan Bishop of Burnley. He was consecrated a bishop on 11 July 1909, by Cosmo Lang, Archbishop of York, at York Minster. He kept this position until his death on 21 October 1931.

References

1858 births
1931 deaths
People from Greystones
People educated at Sherborne School
Fellows of Trinity Hall, Cambridge
Bishops of Burnley
Alumni of Trinity Hall, Cambridge
20th-century Church of England bishops